Mohd Naaim Firdaus bin Stibin (born 24 June 1999) is a Malaysian professional footballer who plays as a midfielder for Malaysia Super League club Sabah.

Club career

Sabah
Naaim made his Malaysia Super League debut on 12 September 2021 when Sabah lost to Perak 1–2.

References

External links

Living people
Malaysian footballers
Sabah F.C. (Malaysia) players
Association football midfielders
1999 births